Pamyat Kommunarov is a rural locality (a settlement) in Maysky Selsoviet, Romanovsky District, Altai Krai, Russia. The population was 27 as of 2013. There is 1 street.

Geography 
Pamyat Kommunarov is located 17 km north of Romanovo (the district's administrative centre) by road. Maysky is the nearest rural locality.

References 

Rural localities in Romanovsky District, Altai Krai